HD NVD Is a Chinese High definition standard created to compete with Blu-ray discs. The standard uses a red laser like the one used in DVD and CD players whereas Blu-ray uses a blue laser. This standard allows the Chinese companies to avoid paying royalties to foreign companies for the manufacture of Blu-ray products.

References

High-definition television
Consumer electronics